The Sandy River is a  tributary of the Columbia River in northwestern Oregon in the United States.

Course
Issuing from Reid Glacier on the southwest flanks of Mount Hood in the Cascade Range, the Sandy River flows generally west and then north for  through Clackamas County and Multnomah County to the Columbia River at Troutdale. In its first , the Sandy River flows across Old Maid Flat, north of Zigzag Mountain in the Mount Hood Wilderness of the Mount Hood National Forest. In this initial stretch near the headwaters, it receives Rushing Water Creek from the left, Muddy Fork from the right, then Lost Creek and Horseshoe Creek from the left, and crosses under Lolo Pass Road just before receiving Clear Creek from the right. From here the river runs roughly parallel to U.S. Route 26, which is on its left for about the next . Just below Zigzag, the Sandy River passes the unincorporated community of Wemme on the left.

Barlow Trail County Park and remnants of the Barlow Road lie to the right along this stretch of the river. Roughly  later, Wildcat Creek enters from the left and then Alder Creek and Whiskey Creek, also from the left. The river passes the Marmot gauging station operated by the United States Geological Survey (USGS) in cooperation with Portland General Electric at river mile (RM) 29.8 (river kilometer (RK) 48.0). The unincorporated community of Marmot lies to the right of the river on a ridge—the Devil's Backbone—separating the Sandy River from the Little Sandy River to the north.

About  further downstream, the river passes Dodge Park on the right, receives the Bull Run River from the right and passes a second USGS gauge at RM 18.4 (RK 29.6). Shortly thereafter, Walker Creek enters from the right. About  further downstream, Bear Creek enters from the left, and the river flows around Indian John Island.

Passing Camp Collins about  later, the river receives Big Creek from the right. Dabney State Recreation Area is on the right about  later.

Discharge

History

Archeological evidence suggests that Native Americans lived along the lower Columbia River as early as 10,000 years ago. The area near what later became The Dalles, on the Columbia east of the mouth of the Sandy River, eventually became an important trading center. The Indians established villages on floodplains and traveled seasonally to gather huckleberries and other food on upland meadows, to fish for salmon, and to hunt elk and deer. Although no direct evidence exists that these lower-Columbia Indians traveled up the Sandy, it is likely that they did. Traces of these people include petroglyphs carved into the rocks of the Columbia River Gorge. More recently, within the past few thousand years, Indians created trails across the Cascade Range around Mount Hood. The trail network linked the trading center at Wascopam, near The Dalles, to settlements in the Willamette Valley. One popular trail crossed over Lolo Pass and another, which later became the Barlow Road, met the Lolo Pass trail roughly where the Zigzag and Salmon rivers enter the Sandy. Indians from villages along the Columbia, Clackamas, and other rivers also traveled by water to the lower Sandy River area to fish for salmon and to gather berries, nuts and roots.

In 1792 William Robert Broughton of the Vancouver Expedition explored the lower Columbia River. He named the Sandy River "Baring River", but noted the existence of a large sand bank that nearly blocked the Columbia River at the mouth of the Sandy River. In 1805 and again in 1806, members of the Lewis and Clark Expedition explored the lower stretches of the Sandy River as they traveled down the Columbia to the Pacific Ocean. Mount Hood, at the river's headwaters, had erupted a few years earlier, causing loose sediment to collect at the river's mouth. On November 3, 1805, William Clark wrote: "I arrived at the entrance of a river which appeared to Scatter over a Sand bar, the bottom of which I could See quite across and did not appear to be 4 Inches deep in any part; I attempted to wade this Stream and to my astonishment found the bottom a quick Sand, and impassable ...".

One of the first documented visits by European-Americans to the upper Sandy River basin occurred in 1838, when Daniel Lee, the nephew of missionary Jason Lee, used the Indian trail over Lolo Pass to drive cattle from a Methodist mission in the Willamette Valley to a mission in Wascopam. Other pioneers later used the trail to drive livestock over the mountains. The first wagons came over the Cascades in 1840, and in 1843 the great east-west migration of settlers to the Oregon Territory began. The Barlow Road, along the Indian trail leading west from the Lolo Trail, opened in 1846 and became popular with new settlers. A branch of this road followed the Devil's Backbone between the Sandy and the Little Sandy watersheds.

Hydroelectric decommissioning
 Until October 2007, the river was dammed and the flow rate regulated. The Bull Run Hydroelectric Project diverted water from the Sandy River at Marmot Dam to Little Sandy Dam on the Little Sandy River. From there the water flowed to Roslyn Lake, an artificial creation, through a wood box flume. The lake supplied the 22-megawatt Bull Run hydroelectric powerhouse and emptied into the Bull Run River.

When in 2008 they demolished Little Sandy Dam, Roslyn Lake ceased to exist. After Marmot Dam was gone, the Sandy flowed freely for the first time since 1912, and the subsequent alterations restored the Little Sandy River to steelhead and salmon runs for the first time in a hundred years. Portland General Electric, the dams' owner, donated  of land in the vicinity to a nature reserve. With the Marmot Dam removal and other habitat restoration in the Sandy River Basin Salmon, Steelhead, and Pacific lamprey are making a comeback. The Lower Salmon River upstream of the former Marmot Dam in recent years has undergone extensive riparian and river restoration. Engineered log jams and the opening of former side channels blocked by the Army Corps of Engineers since the devastating 1964 floods have taken place.

Recreation
The designation applies to two separate segments. Of the total,  were designated "wild",  "scenic", and  "recreational".

A wide variety of recreational activities occur along the Sandy. Hiking, fishing, backpacking, and camping are popular along the upper river. Hikes include the trail to Ramona Falls, a well-known waterfall. Other uses of the upper river and its surrounds include kayaking and cross-country skiing. Fishing, picnicking, non-motorized boating and floating are among popular activities on the lower river.

Parks along the river include Dodge Park, Oxbow Regional Park, Dabney State Recreation Area, Lewis and Clark State Recreation Site, Glenn Otto Park and the Sandy River Delta nature preserve.

See also
 List of rivers of Oregon
 List of longest streams of Oregon
 Oxbow Regional Park
 List of National Wild and Scenic Rivers

References

External links
 Sandy River Basin Watershed Council
 National Wild and Scenic Rivers System

Columbia River Gorge
Wild and Scenic Rivers of the United States
Tributaries of the Columbia River
Rivers of Oregon
Rivers of Clackamas County, Oregon
Rivers of Multnomah County, Oregon
Mount Hood National Forest